EA Montreal is a Canadian video game development studio owned and operated by Electronic Arts. The studio is based in Montreal, Quebec. It was inaugurated by EA on March 17, 2004.

The studio was founded by Alain Tascan a former Ubisoft and BAM! Entertainment executive. It is one of a few examples where EA created a new studio instead of acquiring one. In 2006 with the acquisition of Jamdat, its Montreal offices were moved to the location of EA Montreal studio.

EA Montreal and EA Mobile Montreal are operated separately, however. In 2007, following the split of EA development studios into four labels, EA Montreal became part of EA Games Label (Frank Gibeau, President). EA Montreal is responsible for two original franchises: Boogie and Army of Two as well as other titles where it collaborates with other EA studios.

The Visceral Montreal studio was closed in February 2013. In April 2012, EA announced layoffs in the Mobile division. A further layoff on the Mobile Division took place in February 2015.

In July 2015, EA announced the creation of Motive Studios, a new Montreal-based operation led by Jade Raymond. Motive Studios is co-located at EA Montreal with BioWare, which has maintained a Montreal studio operation under the leadership of studio director Yanick Roy.

EA Montreal studio is located at 3 Place Ville-Marie, downtown Montreal.

Games

References

External links

Companies based in Montreal
Video game companies established in 2004
2004 establishments in Quebec
Electronic Arts
Video game companies of Canada
Video game development companies
Canadian subsidiaries of foreign companies